The Diocese of Dallas may refer to:

Texas
Episcopal Diocese of Dallas
Roman Catholic Diocese of Dallas